Battle of Køge Bay may refer to:

 Battle of Køge Bay (1677)
 Battle of Køge Bay (1710)

See also
 Battle of Køge (1807), between British and Danish land forces